Skinnerton is an unincorporated community in Conecuh County, Alabama, United States.

History
Skinnerton was named for William M. Skinner, who served as the first postmaster.

A post office operated under the name Skinnerton from 1888 to 1926.

References

Unincorporated communities in Conecuh County, Alabama
Unincorporated communities in Alabama